The Lascaris War Rooms are an underground complex of tunnels and chambers in Valletta, Malta that housed the War Headquarters from where the defence of the island was conducted during the Second World War. The rooms were later used by NATO and are now open to the public as a museum.

History 
The British started work on the secret underground in 1940, during the siege of Malta, when a series of tunnels under the Upper Barrakka Gardens and the Saluting Battery that had been used as slave quarters during the Hospitaller period began to be expanded. The complex was completed in early 1943. The site takes its name from the nearby Lascaris Battery, which was itself named after Giovanni Paolo Lascaris, a Grandmaster who had built a garden on the site later occupied by the battery.

The Lascaris War Rooms contained operations rooms for each of the fighting services, from where both the defence of Malta and other operations in the Mediterranean were coordinated. The Operation Headquarters at Lascaris communicated directly with radar stations around the Maltese islands, and it was equipped with Type X machines. The fleets were led from the Navy Plotting Room, while the Anti-Aircraft Guns Operations Room was responsible for the air defence of the island. In the Coast Defence Room, defensive operations in the case of an amphibious invasion were planned. The Filter Room displayed information received from various places, including the naval station at Auberge de Castille.

Lascaris was the advance Allied HQ from where General Eisenhower and his Supreme Commanders Admiral Cunningham, Field Marshal Montgomery and Air Marshal Tedder directed the Allied invasion of Sicily (Operation Husky) in 1943.

Throughout the war, around 1000 people worked in the rooms, including 240 soldiers.

After the war, Lascaris became the Headquarters of the Royal Navy's Mediterranean Fleet. They played an active part during the Suez Crisis of 1956, and were put into full alert during the Cuban Missile Crisis of 1962, when a Soviet missile strike against Malta was feared.

In 1967, the complex was taken over by NATO to be used as a strategic Communication Centre for the interception of Soviet submarines in the Mediterranean. The war rooms continued to serve this function until they were closed down in 1977.

Present day 
The complex was leased to a private venture in 1992, and it was refurbished and open to the public. The rooms closed down in 2005, but were acquired by Fondazzjoni Wirt Artna and the Malta Heritage Trust in 2009 and are once again open to the public. Restoration began soon after, and it is nearly complete. When ready, it is planned that the rooms will form part of a Military Heritage Park, including both the war rooms and the NATO Command Centre, as well as the SS Peter and Paul Counterguard, the Saluting Battery, and the crypt of the former Garrison Chapel.

Gallery

Further reading
 Guillaumier, Alfie (2005). Bliet u Rħula Maltin. Volume 2. Klabb Kotba Maltin. p. 949-950. , .

References 

lASCris war rooms link is now https://www.lascariswarrooms.com/history-and-stories

External links

Official website
National Inventory of the Cultural Property of the Maltese Islands

Buildings and structures in Valletta
Museums in Malta
Mediterranean theatre of World War II
World War II sites in Malta
Allied invasion of Sicily
Military installations of NATO
Secret places
Subterranea (geography)
Military installations closed in 1977
National Inventory of the Cultural Property of the Maltese Islands
1943 establishments in Malta